Orthoporus ornatus (also known as the desert millipede) is a North American species of millipede in the family Spirostreptidae that can be found in the U.S. states of Arizona, New Mexico and Texas, and as far south as the Mexican state of San Luis Potosí. They became very popular in the pet trade and many were exported to Western Europe. Brian Van Der Kieft and Max Prins were the first breeders of this species in Europe. They are dark brownish coloured, but can sometimes be yellow. In fact, in every state the species look different. The antennae are located near the organs of Tömösváry. The species feed on both living and dead organic material. The species prefer sunshine, but can be seen on summer rainy days as well. A disturbed Orthoporus ornatus may curl into a coil and release a toxic substance that is located on all sides of its body. The species can live more than ten years. The species feed on shrubs of Ephedra, which grows in Jornada del Muerto, and on Salsola that grows in Albuquerque.

Classification
The class of this organism is Diplopoda, a diverse group of arthropods. An arthropod can be referred to as an invertebrate that has an exoskeleton, a segmented body and jointed appendages. It can also be put into a group called edaphic organisms since it spends most of its time in the soil. Edaphic means pertaining to the soil.

Description
The desert millipede is small, long, has many legs and body segments. The head, which is the first body segment, has an organ called the Tomosvary organ. This is a sensory organ located at the base of the antennae. For every body segment there are two pairs of legs. It sheds after every time it adds a new body segment.

Range
The desert millipede lives in the Sonoran Desert of western North America. More specifically, it was once found in the eastern city limits of Phoenix, Arizona, and the Papago Park in Phoenix. In general, this millipede lives in a desert ecosystem where there are abundant rocks, shrubs, damp soil and other tree trunks. In one study the desert millipede was also found in Albuquerque, New Mexico.

Habitat
The Orthoporus ornatus enjoys staying in the deep damp soil of a desert ecosystem. The thought of an organism living underground might sound a bit unrealistic. However, the soil is full of honey-comb channels and voids. Not only is the soil full of this millipede's main food source, it also works as protection. Staying underground provides for a safe refuge from any harmful biotic or abiotic events, for example protection from solar ultraviolet radiation.

Behavior
This is a mellow slow-moving organism that enjoys feeding on decaying materials. It is mostly nocturnal; however, it can be spotted after rainy days in the early mornings. It spends most of its time in self-dug burrows. It will emerge from the soil only when the soil is moist. Once the soil is dried up from the desert sun it will go back into the deep soil. Through studies, it was said that movement was at its peak during the early mornings with some nocturnal activity as well. Soil-surface activity stopped before the surface temperature reached 35 degrees Celsius and began again when the ground resumed to 35 degrees Celsius. In the meantime, the millipede went from burrow to burrow. It was found under rocks and sometimes on the aerial portions of shrubs. When it was found on shrubs the air temperature was 35.5 degree Celsius.

Feeding
The desert millipede is not quite picky when it comes to feeding. Its main food source is bacteria, which thrive in the damp soil that it lives around. It will feed on dead plant material and tissues of dead shrubs. Some shrubs it was found eating of off was the cholla, creosote bush, and ocotillo. It was also found eating some surface litter and bark of "Mormon tea" and mesquite. It will also eat tiny pieces of sand, rock and other invertebrate animals (arthropods). It cannot eat in the absence of moist soil.

Ecology
The millipede has certain defenses against its predators, but some vertebrates find that preying on this organism is well worth it. There are about thirteen species that have been observed to feed on millipedes.

Interactions with humans
The desert millipede is a very simple creature that will keep to itself unless bothered or feels threatened. It will curl up into a ball, or coil, when it is disturbed. Sometime it may even release a noxious substance out from the side of its body, or more specifically, through glands that are on top of its legs. This liquid smells and tastes bad. It is toxic to anything that might eat it. This liquid can irritate the skin of a human and will definitely irritate the eyes.

Orthoporus ornatus can be seen as a beneficial and useful part of the desert ecosystem. Because the desert is such a dry place, dead plants and animals take an extra long time to fully decay. The millipede will eat on these decaying matters and "clean up" their environment. If these small organisms did not exist, the desert would overpopulate with dead plants, dead animals and bacteria. Its species life span can range up to 10 years.

References

External links
Images of Orthoporus ornatus on Bug Guide
Orthoporus ornatus on YouTube
Video of Orthoporus ornatus feeding
Desert millipede Orlhoporus ornatus on Flickr

Spirostreptida
Millipedes of North America
Animals described in 1853
North American desert fauna